Barnard Street is a prominent street  in Savannah, Georgia, United States. The street is named for Sir John Barnard, Lord Mayor of London in 1737 and 1740. Its northern section passes through the Savannah Historic District, a National Historic Landmark District.

Barnard Street goes around five of Savannah's 22 squares. They are (from north to south):

Ellis Square
Telfair Square
Orleans Square
Pulaski Square
Chatham Square

Notable buildings and structures

Below is a selection of notable buildings and structures on Barnard Street, all in Savannah's Historic District. From north to south:

David Dillon Building, 19 Barnard Street (1855; later the Bryan Free School)
John Montmollin Warehouse, 21 Barnard Street (1855)
Lawrence/Shaffer Building, 23–25 Barnard Street (1848)
30–38 Barnard Street
Henry Hayme Building, 114 Barnard Street (1889)
Telfair Academy, 121 Barnard Street (1820 and 1880)
Trinity Methodist Church, 127 Barnard Street (1848)
Harper Fowlkes House, 230 Barnard Street (1844 and 1895)
Bernard Constantine Property, 321 Barnard Street (1845)
JEA Building, 328 Barnard Street (1914)
Israel Dasher House, 331 Barnard Street (1844)
Anthony and Mary Basler Property, 344 Barnard Street (1890)
William Kine Property, 419–425 Barnard Street (1854)
William Bradley House, 424 Barnard Street (1859)
William Bradley Commercial Property, 426 Barnard Street (1868)
Dasher Row, 433–441 Barnard Street (1882)
Blues Range, 443–455 Barnard Street (1852)
The Barnard Street School (1901; main entrance on West Taylor Street)
Josephine Mathews Property, 607 Barnard Street (1894)
Frank Keilback House, 609 Barnard Street (1890)
Adrian Robertson House, 612 Barnard Street (1886)
Matthew O'Connell House, 616 Barnard Street (1888)
John Hamlet Property, 701–703 Barnard Street (1870)
Emma Hamlet Property, 705–707 Barnard Street (1856)

References

Roads in Savannah, Georgia
Streets in Georgia (U.S. state)